= Golf View Estates, Lexington =

Neighborhood in Lexington, Kentucky

Coordinates: 38.038°N 84.524°W

Golf View Estates is a neighborhood in southwestern Lexington, Kentucky, United States. Its name is derived from its location next to the Campbell House golf course. Its boundaries are the Campbell House and its golf course to the south, Addison Park to the west, Red Mile Road to the north, and South Broadway to the east.

Neighborhood statistics

- Area: 0.120 square miles (0.31 km^{2})
- Population: 594
- Population density: 4,945 people per square mile
- Median household income: $25,569
